Marion Black is an American soul singer and songwriter from Columbus, Ohio, best known for his 1970 song "Who Knows".

Career
Black’s career began in 1969, when he approached local music operator Bill Moss, with his self-penned song "Who Knows". The resultant single launched Moss's Capsoul record label. The A-side, "Go On Fool", became a minor hit in 1971, peaking at #39 on the US Billboard R&B chart. Black continued his job as a head waiter, and only toured lightly in support of the single. After a dispute over royalties with Capsoul founder Bill Moss, Black left Capsoul for another local label, Prix Records. where he later recorded at Harmonic Sounds. His releases there included "Listen Black Brother", "I'm Gonna Get Loaded", and "(More Love) Is All We Need", but all did not achieve commercial success.

Later in the 1970s, Black recorded at Jack Casey's Rome Studio on East Broad Street, which yielded another nationally distributed single, "Off The Critical List" on Shakat Records.

Three decades later, a tape with a previously unreleased song entitled "Come On and Gettit" was found at an estate sale in Columbus.

Black's recordings have featured on two compilation albums issued by The Numero Group. He is represented on Eccentric Soul: The Capsoul Label (2004) by two tracks, "Who Knows" and "Go On Fool". The compilation Eccentric Soul: The Prix Label (2007) features "Listen Black Brother", along with the unreleased track "Come On and Gettit".

The track "Who Knows" was sampled by the American musician RJD2 in the song "Smoke and Mirrors", from his 2002 album Deadringer. It was also featured on the 2005 soundtrack album Weeds: Music from the Original Series from the first season of Weeds.

"Who Knows?" was played behind the closing credits of the 2006 documentary film, Who Killed the Electric Car?

In February 2013, "Who Knows" was featured on a TV BlackBerry advertisement shown during the U.S. Super Bowl game.

"Who Knows" was featured in season 2, episode 7 of the Hulu Original series Casual.

"Who Knows" was featured at the end of Michael Moore's "Rumble" podcast, Ep. 248: Forget Me Not.

"Who Knows" was featured at the end of an episode of "Bad Sisters" on HBO, episode 4.

Discography

References

External links
 Marion Black on Last.fm
 Discography at Discogs.com
 "Eccentric Soul: The Capsoul Label" Press archive at NumeroGroup.com

American male singers
American soul singers
Singers from Ohio
Living people
Musicians from Columbus, Ohio
Year of birth missing (living people)
Avco Records artists